Marsh Aviation is an aircraft engineering, design, maintenance and re-manufacturing company, situated on East Falcon Drive, at Falcon Field in Mesa, Arizona. The company often works as a sub-contractor to well-known brand-name aerospace companies, discreetly designing and manufacturing components and sub-systems for high-profile programs. The company has also worked on a variety of aircraft programs for governments all over the world.

Founded in December 1961 to convert piston-powered aircraft to turboprop power, the company's first projects involved fitting Rockwell Thrush Commander agricultural aircraft with Garrett AiResearch TPE-331 engines. Later, the firm also re-engined Gulfstream Turbo Cats, Beech Turbo Mentors and Grumman S-2 Trackers with Garrett engines.

The company filed for Chapter 11 bankruptcy in September 2009.

Some of Marsh Aviation's aircraft engineering modification programs include:

 Grumman S-2F3AT Turbo Tracker, a re-engined Grumman S-2 Tracker, with Garrett TPE331 engines. Six converted for Argentine Navy.
 Rockwell/Ayres S2R-T Turbo Thrush airplane, a turboprop conversion of the Rockwell Thrush Commander, using a  Garrett TPE331-1-101 engine. Deliveries started in 1976. 75 conversions were completed by 1985.
 Grumman G164C Turbo Cat airplane, a turboprop conversion of the Grumman Super Ag Cat C/600. Six converted.

Notes

References
 

Aircraft manufacturers of the United States
Companies based in Mesa, Arizona
1961 establishments in Arizona
Vehicle manufacturing companies established in 1961